Franceville is a place-name that may refer to:

Franceville, Gabon
Franceville, New Hebrides, a former name for Port Vila, Vanuatu
Franceville, Ontario, a community in Georgian Bay
France-Ville, a fictional settlement in Oregon Territory, in The Begum's Fortune by Jules Verne

See also 

 Merville-Franceville-Plage, Normandy, France